Corydalis incisa, incised fumewort, is an annual or biennial herbaceous species of plant in the poppy family.  It is also known as purple keman or murasa-kike-man.  Some authorities report it in the family Fumariaceae.  The wildflower is native to Japan, Korea, Taiwan, and China, found in forests, clearings, and irrigation channels.

Incised fumewort is an introduced species in the United States, with populations in New York, Pennsylvania, Maryland, Virginia, West Virginia, North Carolina, Tennessee, and the District of Columbia.  The first reported populations were found in Bronx and Westchester Counties in 2005 and 2014.  The plant can readily escape cultivation; it spreads from seeds explosively ejected from the fruit.  The seed contains an elaiosome, which attracts dispersing ants.  Apparently thriving in fine alluvial sediments, Corydalis incisa forms dense stands, crowding out more desirable riparian understory  plants.

References

External links

 Species description in Persoon, Synopsis Plantarum (1807)

Corydalis
Flora of Japan
Flora of Taiwan
Flora of China